Gyrocollema is a genus of fungi within the family Lichinaceae.

References

Lichinomycetes
Lichen genera
Taxa named by Edvard August Vainio